The 1996 Schleswig-Holstein state election was held on 24 March 1996 to elect the members of the Landtag of Schleswig-Holstein. The incumbent Social Democratic Party (SPD) government led by Minister-President Heide Simonis lost its majority. The SPD subsequently formed a coalition with The Greens, and Simonis continued in office.

Parties
The table below lists parties represented in the previous Landtag of Schleswig-Holstein.

Election result

|-
| colspan=8| 
|-
! colspan="2" | Party
! Votes
! %
! +/-
! Seats 
! +/-
! Seats %
|-
| bgcolor=| 
| align=left | Social Democratic Party (SPD)
| align=right| 597,751
| align=right| 39.8
| align=right| 6.4
| align=right| 33
| align=right| 12
| align=right| 44.0
|-
| bgcolor=| 
| align=left | Christian Democratic Union (CDU)
| align=right| 559,107
| align=right| 37.2
| align=right| 3.4
| align=right| 30
| align=right| 2
| align=right| 40.0
|-
| bgcolor=| 
| align=left | Alliance 90/The Greens (Grüne)
| align=right| 121,939
| align=right| 8.1
| align=right| 3.1
| align=right| 6
| align=right| 6
| align=right| 8.0
|-
| bgcolor=| 
| align=left | Free Democratic Party (FDP)
| align=right| 86,227
| align=right| 5.7
| align=right| 0.1
| align=right| 4
| align=right| 1
| align=right| 5.3
|-
| bgcolor=| 
| align=left | South Schleswig Voters' Association (SSW)
| align=right| 38,285
| align=right| 2.5
| align=right| 0.6
| align=right| 2
| align=right| 1
| align=right| 2.7
|-
! colspan=8|
|-
| bgcolor=| 
| align=left | German People's Union (DVU)
| align=right| 64,335
| align=right| 4.3
| align=right| 2.0
| align=right| 0
| align=right| 6
| align=right| 0
|-
| 
| align=left | Voters' Community of Schleswig-Holstein (WSH)
| align=right| 28,206
| align=right| 1.9
| align=right| 1.9
| align=right| 0
| align=right| ±0
| align=right| 0
|-
| bgcolor=|
| align=left | Others
| align=right| 6,238
| align=right| 0.4
| align=right| 
| align=right| 0
| align=right| ±0
| align=right| 0
|-
! align=right colspan=2| Total
! align=right| 1,502,088
! align=right| 100.0
! align=right| 
! align=right| 75
! align=right| 14
! align=right| 
|-
! align=right colspan=2| Voter turnout
! align=right| 
! align=right| 71.8
! align=right| 0.1
! align=right| 
! align=right| 
! align=right| 
|}

Sources
 Wahlen in Schleswig-Holstein seit 1947

Elections in Schleswig-Holstein
Schleswig-Holstein
March 1996 events in Europe